WTAL (1450 AM) is a radio station broadcasting a Gospel Talk radio format. Now Hallelujah 95.3FM, WTAL is licensed to Tallahassee, Florida, United States, the station serves the Tallahassee area.  The station is currently owned by Live Communications, Inc. and features weekday afternoon and Sunday programming.

References

External links
FCC History Cards for WTAL

TAL
Radio stations established in 1979
1979 establishments in Florida